Creative Diagnostics is an American biotechnology company that specializes in the research and manufacturing of antibodies, viral antigens, diagnostic components, and critical assay reagents.

Founding
Creative Diagnostics was founded in Shirley, New York, USA in 2005. Originally, the business was focused on monoclonal and polyclonal antibodies. Later, various kinds of antibodies, viral antigens, reagents, medical kits, and biological services were launched to broaden the company's activities.

Partnerships
Since 2010, Creative Diagnostics has maintained a strategic commercial partnership agreement with CD Genomics, Inc. The two companies also began a platform license agreement in 2012.

Operations
Creative Diagnostics provides contract research and manufacturing services. Additionally, the company conducts ELISA testing. Other products include:

Matched antibody pairs
Anti-idiotypic Antibodies
HBV Core Antigen
Antibody Isotyping Kits
Protein Antigen Expression Service
Fluorescent Dye Labeling
DNA Immunization Antibody Production

References

Biotechnology companies of the United States